Into the Badlands is a 1991 American Western horror television film. It stars Bruce Dern, Mariel Hemingway, and Helen Hunt. It was directed by Sam Pillsbury and written by Dick Beebe, Marjorie David, and Gordon Dawson. The film was nominated for a 1992 Primetime Emmy in Cinematography for a Miniseries or a Special (Johnny E. Jensen).

Plot

Three seemingly disconnected stories are joined together by a mystery Man in Black (T.L. Barston, played by Bruce Dern). This bounty hunter searches the Old West for Red Roundtree, a wanted outlaw.

Cast
 Bruce Dern as T. L. Barston
 Mariel Hemingway as Alma Heusser
 Helen Hunt as Blossom
 Dylan McDermott as McComas
 Lisa Pelikan as Sarah Carstairs
 Andrew Robinson as Sheriff Aaron Starett
 Michael J. Metzger as Red Roundtree

References

External links
 
 Movie trailer
 
 
 

1991 television films
1991 films
1991 horror films
1991 Western (genre) films
1990s English-language films
1990s Western (genre) horror films
American horror television films
American Western (genre) horror films
Films based on American short stories
Films based on works by Henry Wilson Allen
Films directed by Sam Pillsbury
Films scored by John Debney
USA Network original films
American Western (genre) television films
Works about bounty hunters
1990s American films